Pól Callaghan was an Irish nationalist politician in Northern Ireland, representing the Social Democratic and Labour Party. On 15 November 2010, he succeeded Mark Durkan as Member of the Legislative Assembly for Foyle.

Regarding the election, Callaghan said, "We know the people of Derry are hungry for change and as a new representative I can help build a newly energized SDLP to deliver it." Callaghan failed to retain his seat at the 2011 Assembly election.

References

Living people
Northern Ireland MLAs 2007–2011
Social Democratic and Labour Party politicians
Social Democratic and Labour Party MLAs
Place of birth missing (living people)
Year of birth missing (living people)
Politicians from Derry (city)